Warren the Ape is an MTV reality show parody which ran from June 14 to August 30, 2010 and aired at 10:30 p.m. The series is a spin-off of the IFC and Fox TV show Greg the Bunny, and follows the titular character's life as he tries to get his life back together following the cancellation of Greg the Bunny.

Warren has paid more attention to drugs, booze, and women than his career, which has degenerated into a series of seedy exploitation films, obscure industrials, low-rent theater productions, and a regrettable string of skin flicks.  With the help of his addiction specialist, Dr. Drew Pinsky, Warren tries (and often fails) to clean up his act, patch up his relationships, and claw his way back into the Hollywood limelight.

The series was created by Sean S. Baker, Spencer Chinoy, and Dan Milano, and is produced in association with MTV, Freestyle Entertainment, and Picture Shack Entertainment.

On November 19, 2010, the official Greg the Bunny/Warren the Ape website confirmed that there would be no season 2, and the show was in fact cancelled.

History
Greg the Bunny was a franchise that began with Junktape a half-hour, bi-weekly cable TV Public-access television show created by Sean S. Baker, Spencer Chinoy, and Dan Milano. The show aired on New York City's Manhattan Neighborhood Network, Monday nights at 11:30 p.m.   Warren did not appear on Junktape, but when the show's main character, Greg the Bunny, caught the attention of the Independent Film Channel (IFC) and was hired to introduce their independent films, the creators realized they needed someone with a little more intellectual focus to present their trivia segments. This is how Warren "The Ape" DeMontague was born.

The Greg the Bunny Show on IFC followed Greg, Warren, and other characters introducing independent films via a series of puppet-acted parodies. Warren and Greg were both performed and voiced by Dan Milano.

Warren and Greg then moved on to Fox TV in their biggest incarnation yet.  The Fox show made its debut in March 2002 and its last episode aired in August 2002, with two episodes unaired.  Despite its brief run, the series acquired a significant cult following, and was released on DVD in 2004.

In August 2005, Warren the Ape along with Greg the Bunny returned to the IFC, in a series of short segments, both old and new, spoofing movies such as Annie Hall, Miller's Crossing, Barton Fink, Fargo, Blue Velvet, Easy Rider and Pulp Fiction. The cast for these segments primarily features puppets Greg and Warren DeMontague, with appearances from Frederick "Count" Blah, puppet agent Pal Friendlies, and The Wumpus. Tardy the Turtle and Susan the Monster were unable to appear on IFC because they were created solely for the Fox series. This incarnation lasted for two seasons and is also available on DVD.

Characters
Warren DeMontague (voiced by Dan Milano) is the main character on the show, a veteran stage actor trying to make a new name for himself while having several substance-related vices. Frequently drunk and hardly ever prepared, Warren desperately tries to project an air of dignity (while wearing a ridiculous helmet).
Dr. Drew Pinsky (as himself) is Warren's advisor whom Warren visits to update him on his progress.
Cecil Greenblatt (played by Josh Sussman) is Warren's personal assistant whom he verbally abuses, also serving as his driver.
Raquel (played by Mary K. DeVault) is Warren's "girlfriend."
Laura (played by Laura Kachergus) is the leader of Warren's AA group, who has little patience for Warren's disruptive outbursts.
Greg the Bunny is a side character, the title character of Greg the Bunny. He acts mostly as comic relief, and jokes are made at his expense (particularly by Warren) about how he cannot act and that he is just there to look cute.
Seth Green played Jimmy Bender on the Fox version of Greg the Bunny, bearing a grudge against Warren for sleeping with his girlfriend. At Warren's attempts to patch things up between them, resulting with him accidentally having sex with Clare Grant, Seth ended up heavily hospitalized when accidentally hit by Cecil's car. By the time Warren visits him to borrow some money, Seth manages to regain use of his left hand to give a gesture as his way of saying no.
Sarah Silverman is one of Warren's former co-stars, hates Warren for an unknown reason and changing her number to get away from him. When Warren arrived to her studio to borrow some money, she went out in a rage until Warren seduced her and they had aggressive sex. But in doing so, Warren got their sex scene, though barely filmed from outside the building, on live television while forgetting all about the money in the heat of the moment.

Episodes

Appearances in other shows
Warren the Ape made a guest segment on Talk Soup, which aired in 2002.  In it, Warren appears alongside guest host Sarah Silverman.

References

2010s American parody television series
2010 American television series debuts
2010 American television series endings
American television shows featuring puppetry
American television spin-offs
English-language television shows
MTV original programming
Reality television series parodies
Television series about actors
Television series about show business
Television series about television